The following radio stations broadcast on AM frequency 1260 kHz: There are 55 stations in the United States which broadcast on 1260 AM; the Federal Communications Commission classifies 1260 AM as a regional frequency.

Argentina
 LT14 Gral Urquiza in Paraná, Entre Ríos

Canada
Station in bold is Class A

Japan
 JOIR in Sendai

Mexico
 XECSAE-AM in Zamora, Michoacan
  in Santiago Jamiltepec, Oaxaca
 XEL-AM in Mexico City
  in San Luis Río Colorado, Sonora
  in Salamanca, Guanajuato.

United Kingdom
 Sabras Radio in Leicestershire

United States

Venezuela
YVRM at Caracas

References

Lists of radio stations by frequency